The 2007–08 Marist Red Foxes women's basketball team represented Marist College during the 2007–08 NCAA Division I women's basketball season. The Red Foxes, led by sixth year head coach Brian Giorgis, play their home games at the McCann Center and were members of the Metro Atlantic Athletic Conference. They finished the season ranked No. 22 and went 32–3, 18–0 in MAAC play to finish in first place to win the MAAC regular season title for the fifth consecutive time. In the MAAC women's basketball tournament, they defeated #8 seed Canisius in the quarterfinals, #5 seed Saint Peter's in the semifinals, and #2 seed Iona in the championship game to earn the conference's automatic bid to the NCAA women's tournament. It was their third consecutive MAAC Tournament championship. As a #7 seed, they defeated #10 seed DePaul 76–57 in the First Round before falling to #2 seed and No. 6 LSU 49–68 in the Second Round.

Roster

Schedule

|-
!colspan=9 style=|Regular Season

|-
!colspan=9 style=| MAAC Women's Tournament

|-
!colspan=9 style=| NCAA tournament

References

Marist Red Foxes women's basketball seasons
Marist
2007–08 NCAA Division I women's basketball season
2008 NCAA Division I women's basketball tournament participants